The 2006–07 Virginia Tech Hokies men's basketball team is an NCAA Division I college basketball team that competed in the Atlantic Coast Conference, finishing the regular season as the third place team in the conference. This season saw the Hokies make their first NCAA Tournament appearance since 1996.

During the 2006–2007 regular season, Virginia Tech beat Duke at Cameron Indoor Stadium and also swept North Carolina defeating the top-ranked team both in Blacksburg, VA and their home court in Chapel Hill, NC, although losing 3 times in a row to NC State including a loss ending their ACC tournament run.

Roster

2006–2007 schedule and results

References 

Virginia Tech Hokies men's basketball seasons
Virgnia Tech
Virginia Tech
Virginia Tech
Virginia Tech